George Edward William Stillyards (29 December 1918 – 9 January 2010) was an English professional footballer who made 100 appearances in the Football League playing for Lincoln City. He played as a full back.

Life and career
Stillyards was born in Whisby, Lincolnshire, and joined Lincoln City during the Second World War. He went on to help the club to promotion to the Second Division in the 1947–48 season, and made his 100th Football League appearance, and last appearance for Lincoln, in August 1949. He later played for Stalybridge Celtic, Grantham Town and Brigg Town, and was player-manager of Skegness Town, playing as a centre-half rather than his normal right-back position. He was described as "not a dirty player, but he took few prisoners".

He played cricket for Lincolnshire in the Minor Counties Championship in 1950.

Stillyards was working as a machinist for Ruston's when he married May in Washingborough in 1944. The couple had three daughters. After retiring from football, Stillyards resumed his employment at Ruston's, and later became a bookmaker. He played bowls until well into his eighties. He died at home in Leasingham, Sleaford, Lincolnshire, in January 2010 at the age of 91.

References

1918 births
2010 deaths
People from North Kesteven District
English footballers
Association football defenders
Lincoln City F.C. players
Stalybridge Celtic F.C. players
Grantham Town F.C. players
Skegness Town A.F.C. players
Brigg Town F.C. players
English Football League players
Midland Football League players
English football managers
English cricketers
Lincolnshire cricketers